Chorisops tibialis, the dull four-spined legionnaire, is a   Palearctic species of soldier fly.

A small (Size 3 to 4 mm.) slender fly. The male has a metallic green thorax and scutellum (both are greenish black in 
females). The humeri may be yellowish. The scutellum bears four yellow spines. The abdomen in both males and females is yellow (discally) and  black at the sides and posteriorly. The male has black and tan banded legs. Females have yellow legs with dark tarsi. The clear wings have dark stigma.
The habitat is moist or shaded locations with trees. Males sometimes in rapidly moving swarms. Adults are found from
June to September. The saproxylic larvae found in decaying wood debris and rot holes of trees.

References

Stratiomyidae
Taxa named by Johann Wilhelm Meigen
Diptera of Europe
Diptera of Africa
Diptera of Asia
Insects described in 1820